Stone Lake may refer to:

Populated places
 Stone Lake, Wisconsin, a town in Washburn County, Wisconsin, USA
 Stone Lake (community), Wisconsin, an unincorporated community, USA

Lakes
 Stone Lake in Ashley County, Arkansas
 Stone Lake in Faulkner County, Arkansas
 Stone Lake (New Mexico), a lake in New Mexico

Parks 
 Stone Lake (California), a park property in Sacramento County, California, USA

See also 
 Stony Lake (disambiguation)
 Big Stone Lake, Minnesota/South Dakota, USA
 Redstone Lake (disambiguation), Ontario, Canada
 Three Stone Lake, Nova Scotia, Canada

pl:Kamień#Jeziora